Kariba Airport  is an international airport serving Kariba, Mashonaland West Province, Zimbabwe.

There have been calls from local politicians and tourism businesses for the modest airport to be refurbished.

Fastjet Zimbabwe have announced that they will be introducing scheduled services to Kariba Airport from both Harare and Victoria Falls, commencing in late March 2023.

See also
Transport in Zimbabwe
List of airports in Zimbabwe

References

External links
SkyVector - Kariba Airport
OurAirports - Kariba Intl
Kariba Intl
OpenStreetMap - Kariba

Airports in Zimbabwe
Buildings and structures in Mashonaland West Province